Casa is the second album by Mexican pop-rock singer Natalia Lafourcade, using the name of her band, Natalia y La Forquetina. Casa was released in 2005. It won Best Rock Album by a Duo Or Group With Vocals at the 7th Annual Latin Grammy Awards. 

The single "Solamente Te Lo Doy a Ti" was featured on the soundtrack of the Mexican movie Niñas Mal (2007). The bonus Track "O Pato (Un Pato)", was released first on the soundtrack of the Mexican movie Temporada de patos (2004). The album was released in Mexico on August 30, 2005. It reached No. 1 on the Mexican Chart and was certified gold by the Asociación Mexicana de Productores de Fonogramas y Videogramas for over 50,000 shipments.

Track listing

Charts and certifications

Charts

Certification

References

Natalia Lafourcade albums
Sony Music Mexico albums
2005 albums
Latin Grammy Award for Best Rock Album by a Duo or Group with Vocal